Fatal Affair is a 2020 American psychological thriller film directed by Peter Sullivan, who co-wrote the screenplay with Rasheeda Garner. It stars Nia Long, Omar Epps, Stephen Bishop, and KJ Smith.

It was released on July 16, 2020, by Netflix.

Plot

Ellie Warren is a successful attorney living with her husband Marcus who is recovering after a horrible car accident. They have just moved into a new house on the coast from the city of San Francisco now that their daughter Brittany has left for college. Ellie meets her firm's new tech consultant, David Hammond, who both first met each other in college. David is in anger management therapy following an incident with a woman named Deborah. Ellie and David initially meet for drinks, but the situation turns sexual as they go to the bathroom of a club, although Ellie resists. Afterwards, David stalks her via phone calls, texts, viewings of her house from a distance, breaking into her home, hacking into her home security system, sending her a package, and dating Ellie's friend Courtney. This is all despite Ellie's warnings to stay away from her and her family.

Ellie learns from another one of her former college classmates that David murdered his ex-wife Deborah and her new boyfriend a few months after the divorce. Ellie sends Courtney an e-mail with information about Deborah's murder and how David likely committed it, but David deletes it. Ellie is horrified to see him golfing with Marcus. She convinces the concierge at David's building to let her into his apartment, where she finds pictures of Deborah and of herself taken from afar on his computer. As Ellie calls Courtney about the pictures, David gets to Courtney’s place and attacks her. She is found bleeding from the head by Ellie and taken to the hospital. With the police now looking for David, he tries to pull a trick on the public by making them think he committed suicide; he sets a homeless man on fire with a suicide note. The police find all the evidence in his home, including a confession for his ex-wife’s murder.

One night, Ellie gets a message from her assistant (presumably from David) to sign some documents. Ellie stops by her office and finds her assistant murdered on the floor. Ellie rushes home and calls the police, before she finds David alive and knocks him unconscious with a vase. She encounters the corpse of Brittany's boyfriend Scott, and finds Marcus and Brittany tied up. She frees them as the police arrive, but David kills a cop. As Brittany gets into her car and drives away, a fight ensues between Marcus, David, and Ellie, which ends with David falling to his death on a beach cliffside. A few months later, Marcus and Ellie send Brittany back to school, and their house is for sale.

Cast
 Nia Long as Ellie Warren
 Omar Epps as David Hammond
 Stephen Bishop as Marcus Warren
 KJ Smith as Deborah Lee
 Jason Shane Scott as Travis Green
 Aubrey Cleland as Brittany Warren
 Maya Stojan as Courtney
 Carolyn Hennesy as Janice 
 Kate Orsini as Lauralee 
 Lyn Alicia Henderson as Detective Larson
 Fredella Calloway as Dr. Leigh Beverly
 Jacob Aaron Gaines as Scott 
 Kym Jackson as Nicole
 Estelle Swaray as Linda

Production
In October 2019, Deadline reported that Netflix had partnered with Hybrid Films with Peter Sullivan directing the film project. Nia Long, Omar Epps and Stephen Bishop were attached to star in the film, with Sullivan and Rasheeda Garner writing the script. Long, Barry Barnholtz, Brian Nolan and Jeffrey Schenck would serve as producers on the film. In November 2019, it was announced KJ Smith had joined the cast of the film. Principal photography for the film took place on location in Los Angeles, California in 2019.

Release
The film was released on July 16, 2020 by Netflix. It was the top-streamed film on the site in its debut weekend, then placed sixth the following weekend.

Reception
The website's critics consensus reads: "As basic as its title, Fatal Affair gets lost between 'so bad it's good' and 'barely there.'" On Metacritic, the film has a weighted average score of 34 out of 100, based on 10 critics, indicating "generally unfavorable reviews".

Kate Erbland of IndieWire gave the film a "C−" and wrote: "Too chaste to be a Fatal Attraction ripoff and far too dull to approach the hammy charms of Obsessed the greatest assets of Peter Sullivan's Fatal Affair are stars Nia Long and Omar Epps. They keep this from looking and feeling like a limp Lifetime movie knockoff."

References

External links 
 
 

2020 films
2020 psychological thriller films
2020s serial killer films
American psychological thriller films
American serial killer films
African-American films
Films about murderers
Films about narcissism
Films about stalking
Films set in San Francisco
Films shot in Los Angeles
Films shot in San Francisco
English-language Netflix original films
Films directed by Peter Sullivan
2020s English-language films
2020s American films